Raphitoma volutella is a species of sea snail, a marine gastropod mollusk in the family Raphitomidae.

Description
This is a Plio-Pleistocene species

Distribution

References

Pusateri F. & Giannuzzi Savelli R., 2008. A new raphitomine neogastropod from the Mediterranean Sea (Conoidea). Ibersu 26(2): 119–126

volutella
Gastropods described in 1840